SM U-125 was one of the 329 submarines serving in the Imperial German Navy in World War I. 
U-125 was engaged in the naval warfare and took part in the First Battle of the Atlantic.

Design
German Type UE II submarines were preceded by the shorter Type UE I submarines. U-125 had a displacement of  when at the surface and  while submerged. The submarine was powered by two  engines for use while surfaced, and two  engines for use while submerged. She had two shafts and two  propellers.

U-125 was fitted with four  torpedo tubes (fitted at its bow), twelve torpedoes, two  mine chutes (fitted at its stern), forty-two mines, one  SK L/45 deck gun, and 494 rounds. She had a complement of forty (thirty-six crew members and four officers).

Service

Germany

Post-war 
U-125 was surrendered to Japan on 26 November 1918 and was renamed O-1 in 1920 or 1921. She was dismantled at the Yokosuka Naval Arsenal between January and March 1921. Between March 1924 and January 1925, she was used as a floating jetty at the Kure KSubmarine School. In 1925, she was rebuilt at Yokosuka as testbed for submarine salvage operations carried out by the submarine tender . On 19 August 1931, the formerO-1 was recommissioned as Auxiliary Vessel No. 2900 and used as such until 1935.

References

Notes

Citations

Bibliography

World War I submarines of Germany
1918 ships
Ships built in Hamburg
U-boats commissioned in 1918
Foreign submarines of the Imperial Japanese Navy
German Type UE II submarines